St. Oswald is a Metropolitan Borough of Sefton ward in the Bootle Parliamentary constituency that covers the northern part of the locality of Netherton. The population of this ward taken at the 2011 census was 11,849.

Councillors

Election results

Elections of 2015

References

Wards of the Metropolitan Borough of Sefton